Statistics of Allsvenskan in season 1967.

Overview
The league was contested by 12 teams, with Malmö FF winning the championship.

League table

Results

Footnotes

References 

Allsvenskan seasons
1
Sweden
Sweden